United Nations Water (UN-Water) is an interagency mechanism that coordinates the efforts of United Nations entities and international organizations working on water and sanitation issues. 
"Over 30 UN organizations carry out water and sanitation programmes, reflecting the fact that water issues run through all of the UN's main focus areas. UN-Water's role is to coordinate so that the UN family 'delivers as one' in response to water related challenges."
The majority of the offices is located in Geneva, Switzerland.

Issues 
Water is at the core of sustainable development and is critical for socio-economic development, healthy ecosystems and for human survival itself. Ecosystems across the world, particularly wetlands, are in decline in terms of the services they provide. Between US$4.3 and US$20.2 trillion per year worth of ecosystem services were lost between 1997 and 2011 due to land use change.
Water is vital for reducing the global burden of disease and improving the health, welfare and productivity of populations. Today, 2.1 billion people lack access to safely managed drinking water services and 4.5 billion people lack safely managed sanitation services.

Water is also at the heart of adaptation to climate change, serving as the crucial link between the climate system, human society and the environment. Without proper water governance, there is likely to be increased competition for water between sectors and an escalation of water crises of various kinds, triggering emergencies in a range of water-dependent sectors. By 2025, 1.8 billion people are expected to be living in conditions with absolute water scarcity, and two-thirds of the world population could be under water stress conditions.

The physical world of water is closely bound up with the socio-political world, with water often a key factor in managing risks such as famine, migration, epidemics, inequalities and political instability. Since 1900, more than 11 million people have died as a consequence of drought and more than 2 billion have been affected by drought, more than any other physical hazard.

Activities 

UN-Water members and partners inform about water and sanitation policies, monitor and report on progress, and coordinate two annual global campaigns on World Water Day and World Toilet Day.

Key policy processes 

UN-Water members and partners have helped embed water and sanitation in several agreements, such as the 2030 Agenda for Sustainable Development (which led to the Sustainable Development Goals (SDGs)), the 2015-2030 Sendai Framework for Disaster Risk Reduction, the 2015 Addis Ababa Action Agenda on Financing for Development, and the 2015 Paris Agreement within the UN Convention Framework on Climate Change.

Monitoring and reporting 

To meet the needs of the 2030 Agenda, UN-Water launched the Integrated Monitoring Initiative for SDG 6, building on and expanding the experience and lessons learned during the MDG period.

All the custodian agencies of the SDG 6 global indicators have come together under the initiative, which includes the work of WHO/UNICEF Joint Monitoring Programme for Water Supply and Sanitation (JMP), the inter-agency initiative GEMI and UN-Water Global Analysis and Assessment of Sanitation and Drinking-Water (GLAAS).

Campaigns 

Every year, UN-Water coordinates the United Nations international observances on freshwater and sanitation: World Water Day and World Toilet Day. Depending on the official UN theme of the campaign, they are led by one or more UN-Water Members and Partners with a related mandate. On World Water Day, UN-Water releases the World Water Development Report focusing on the same topic as the campaign.

Governance

Members and Partners 
UN agencies, programmes and funds with a water-related mandate are Members of UN-Water. Partners are international organizations, professional unions, associations or other civil-society groups that are actively involved in water and that have the capacity and willingness to contribute tangibly to the work of UN-Water.

Senior Programme Managers 
The UN-Water Senior Programme Managers are the representatives of the UN-Water Members at UN-Water. They provide the overall governance and strategic direction. Collectively, they constitute the highest operational decision-making body of UN-Water.

Chair, Vice-Chair, Secretary 
The Chair of UN-Water is nominated among the UN Executive Heads, after consultations in the UN System Chief Executives Board for Coordination. The vice-chair of UN-Water is elected among the UN-Water Senior Programme Managers. The UN DESA Senior Programme Manager serves as Secretary of UN-Water ex-officio.

List of UN-Water Chairs

History 
1977: The UN's Intersecretariat Group for Water Resources coordinates UN activities on water and has a three-person secretariat in the UN Department of Economic and Social Affairs' (UN-DESA) predecessor in New York.

1992: The Group is subsumed into the UN Administrative Coordination Committee's (ACC) Subcommittee on Water Resources, which functions for several years before being disbanded. Members continued to meet informally to continue collaborating around water issues.

1993: The UN General Assembly designates 22 March as World Water Day.

2003: UN-Water is established, endorsed by the successor to the ACC: the UN System Chief Executives Board for Coordination.

2005-2015: UN-Water coordinates the 'Water for Life' International Decade for Action, culminating in the Sanitation Drive to 2015, a campaign to meet the 2000-2015 Millennium Development Goals' sanitation target and end open defecation.

2012: The Key Water Indicator Portal is launched, backed by a federated database containing data from several UN agencies.

2013: The UN General Assembly designates 19 November as World Toilet Day.

2014: UN-Water launches its 2014-2020 Strategy in support of the 2030 Agenda.

2015: The 2030 Agenda's Sustainable Development Goals are launched and a dedicated goal on water and sanitation is adopted by the UN General Assembly with input from UN-Water's Technical Advice Unit.

2016: The Integrated Water Monitoring initiative is launched with the aim of reporting on progress on water and sanitation in a coherent and coordinated way.

2017: "Why Waste Water" was the 2017 World Water Day theme emphasizing both the importance of not wasting water, as well as new policy initiatives around waste water.

References

External links

Monitoring SDG 6 on Water and Sanitation website
United Nations webpage on water
United Nations microsite on the Sustainable Development Goals

Water and politics
Water
United Nations Development Programme
Food and Agriculture Organization
United Nations Environment Programme
World Health Organization
Water security